Beryoza literally meaning "birch tree" in Russian, may refer to
Russian-language name of Byaroza, a town in Belarus
Beryoza, call sign of Samara Airlines, Russia
, a Russian radar warning receiver
Beryoza River, Russia
T-80UD "Beryoza", a Russian tank T-80 model

See also
Bereza (disambiguation)